KATS (94.5 FM) is a radio station  broadcasting a mainstream rock format. Licensed to Yakima, Washington, United States, the station serves Yakima and Kittitas Counties.  The station is currently owned by Townsquare Media.

Translators
In addition to the main station, KATS is relayed by an additional translator to widen its broadcast area.

References

External links
Official Website
 Flash Stream, MP3 Stream

Active rock radio stations in the United States
Radio stations established in 1968
ATS
Townsquare Media radio stations